Atakan Cangöz (born 30 March 1992) is a Turkish professional footballer who plays as a midfielder for Çorum.

Professional career
After years on loan with various lower division Turkish teams, Cangöz made his professional debut for Antalyaspor in a 4-1 Süper Lig victory over Gaziantepspor on 2 June 2017.

References

External links
 
 
 

1992 births
Footballers from Istanbul
Living people
Turkish footballers
Association football midfielders
Antalyaspor footballers
Fethiyespor footballers
Süper Lig players
TFF Second League players
TFF Third League players